Trevor Kronemann and David Macpherson were the defending champions but lost in the quarterfinals to Luis Lobo and Javier Sánchez.

Lobo and Sánchez won in the final 6–1, 6–3 against Neil Broad and Piet Norval.

Seeds
Champion seeds are indicated in bold text while text in italics indicates the round in which those seeds were eliminated. The top four seeded teams received byes into the second round.

Draw

Final

Top half

Bottom half

References
 1996 Trofeo Conde de Godó Doubles Draw

Doubles